Tracline 65 was a bus route in Birmingham, England which included the first guided busway in the United Kingdom.

The existing route 65 bus route was upgraded as part of an experiment to improve bus services, by the West Midlands Passenger Transport Executive. A 600-metre section of concrete-edged guideway was installed on Streetly Road in the Short Heath area, a few miles from Erdington village, at the northern terminal of the route. Located in a central reservation once used by Birmingham Corporation trams, it was segregated from the carriageway used by other vehicular traffic. At the southern end of the trackway, buses used ordinary roads to reach the city centre.

Fourteen MCW Metrobus Mark II buses were acquired and fitted with guide wheels, which ran along the guideway's concrete edges. The vehicles were painted in a distinct livery, unique to Tracline 65, being silver with black and red detailing. It began operating in 1984. The trial ended in 1987 and all buses had their guide wheels removed and returned to normal services; the last withdrawn on 26 April 2008. The buses retained their distinctive destination display and gap in the front wheel arch where the guide wheels had been. One, fleet number 8110, is preserved at Aston Manor Road Transport Museum.

References

External links

History and pictures
Film of the service in operation
Colour picture of a Tracline bus showing guide wheel, just ahead of the front road wheel

Bus routes in the West Midlands (county)
Busways
Erdington
Guided busways and BRT systems in the United Kingdom
History of Birmingham, West Midlands
Transport in Birmingham, West Midlands
1984 establishments in England
1987 disestablishments in England